KRAF is a radio station at 88.3 FM in Fort Stockton, Texas. It is owned by Christian Television Radio Ministry and carries a Spanish Christian format known as Radio Agape.

References

External links

Radio stations established in 2009
2009 establishments in Texas
RAF
Christian radio stations in Texas